Interstate H-1 (H-1) is the longest and busiest Interstate Highway in the US state of Hawaii. The highway is located on the island of Oʻahu. Despite the number, this is an east–west highway; the 'H'-series (for Hawaii) numbering reflects the order in which routes were funded and built. H-1 goes from Route 93 (Farrington Highway) in Kapolei to Route 72 (Kalanianaole Highway) in Kāhala. East of Middle Street in Honolulu (exit 19A), H-1 is also known as the Lunalilo Freeway, after the former Hawaiian king, and is sometimes signed as such at older signs in central Honolulu. West of Middle Street, H-1 is also known as the Queen Liliʻuokalani Freeway, after the former Hawaiian queen; this name is shown on some roadmaps. It is both the southernmost and westernmost signed Interstate Highway located in the US.

Route description

H-1 begins near the Campbell Industrial Park in the town of Kapolei. West of this point, Route 93 (Farrington Highway) continues toward Waianae. The freeway continues east, passing the community of Makakilo until reaching the junction with Route 750 (north to Kunia Camp) and Route 76 (south to ʻEwa Beach).

H-1 then continues along the northern edge of Waipahu approximately  until its junction with H-2. At this point, the highway runs along a viaduct above Route 92 (Nimitz Highway), passing to the north of Daniel K. Inouye International Airport.

 past the airport exit, three lanes exit the freeway at exit 18A to join Nimitz Highway toward Waikiki, while, half a mile later, the remaining two lanes make a sharp turn south as H-1 reaches another major interchange with the east end of H-201. Access is provided by a left exit from H-1 east only. H-1 west does not have access to H-201 at this point.

From here, H-1 runs through the city of Honolulu along a series of underpasses and viaducts. A flyover interchange leading to Downtown Honolulu has a westbound exit and an eastbound entrance. H-1 ends in the Kāhala district of Honolulu near Kahala Mall, where Route 72 (Kalanianaole Highway) ends.

During morning commute hours on weekdays, an eastbound contraflow express lane is deployed from just east of exit 5 to exit 18A, where it connects to the beginning of the Nimitz Highway contraflow lane. The H-1 contraflow lane is often referred to as a "zipper lane" due to the use of a movable concrete barrier and a zipper machine. The H-1 and Nimitz Highway contraflow lanes are restricted to buses, motorcycles, and vehicles with two or more occupants while in operation.

History

A set of Interstate Highways serving Oʻahu were authortized by the federal government in 1960, a year after Hawaii was admitted as a state. One of the corridors, connecting Barbers Point to Diamond Head, was designated as H-1 by the Bureau of Public Roads (now the Federal Highway Administration) on August 29, 1960. The portion of H-1 that runs through Downtown Honolulu had opened in 1953 as the Mauka Arterial and was incorporated into the new freeway. This section has been largely unchanged since its inception and its design suffers from having too many on/offramps, short distanced onramps, and onramps that enter the freeway almost immediately before an offramp (opposite of current design standards). The 'new' section of H-1 was, however, built to modern freeway standards.

Construction on the first new section of H-1 began in 1963, shortly after alignments were approved for most of the freeway. The Lunalilo Freeway, already planned by the state government and funded with a 50-percent match from the federal government, was incorporated into plans for H-1 in 1965 following the rejection of five other proposed routings. The westernmost section of H-1 in Makakilo opened on September 29, 1966. The Kapiolani Interchange, opened in October 1967, filled a gap between two sections of the Lunalilo Freeway spanning  in Honolulu.

The Hawaiian Interstate shields have gone through several changes. Early shields contained the hyphen as per the official designation (e.g., H-1); however, these shields have been updated with the hyphen removed (e.g., H1). As in other states across the contiguous US, early Interstate shields also included the writing of 'Hawaii' above the Interstate route number and below the 'Interstate' writing. While the "Queen Liliʻuokalani" section of H-1 has signs designating it as such (one eastbound at exit 1, the other westbound after exit 19), there are no similar name signs for the Lunalilo Freeway portion (the remainder of the freeway).

Interstate H-4

In the 1960s, a fourth freeway that would have been Interstate H-4 (H-4) was proposed for the city of Honolulu. The intent of H-4 was to provide relief to the congested H-1 through Downtown Honolulu. Had it been built, the  route of H-4 would have started at exit 18 (H-1/Nimitz Highway interchange) and followed the Honolulu waterfront to the Kapiolani interchange (exit 25B). The idea, however, was unpopular and the freeway was never built.

Exit list

Auxiliary routes
A portion of the Moanalua Freeway is designated as H-201. Until mid-2004, it was signed as Route 78.

References

External links

Exit List for Interstate H-1
Photos of Interstate H-1

H1
Interstate Highways in Hawaii
Transportation in Honolulu County, Hawaii